Cross Current (/ A Perfect Murder According to Law),, is a 1971 Italian-Spanish giallo film directed by Tonino Ricci, starring Ivan Rassimov and Rosanna Yanni. The film's original working title was Il buio nel cervello (A Darkness in the Brain)

Plot
A wealthy speedboat racer named Marco suffers a boat accident and must get brain surgery, after which he loses his memory and is cared for by his wife Monica, his business partner Tommy, and a young girl named Terry. Marco develops a relationship with Terry, which infuriates his wife. Murders begin occurring around the estate. Monica gets shot dead while fighting with Terry, and Terry talks Marco into disposing of Monica's body at sea. His partner Tommy and the estate's gardener are murdered next, then the gardener's mother. Later, Marco's dead wife Monica reappears from the dead, and Marco drives his car off a cliff in a panic. The whole thing appears to have been a plot between Monica and Marco's other partner (Burt) to get rid of Marco, but when Monica realizes that Terry and Burt are lovers, she shoots them both dead. But Monica, now alone, becomes the prey of a stalking killer wearing black gloves.

Cast 
 Philippe Leroy as Marco Breda
 Elga Andersen as Monica Breda
 Ivan Rassimov as Burt
 Rosanna Yanni as Terry Povani
 Franco Ressel as Tommy Brown
 Rina Franchetti as Anna
 Julio Peña as Inspector Baldini
 Franco Fantasia as Professor  Mauri
 Liana Del Balzo as Mother of Sante

References

External links

1971 films
1970s crime thriller films
Giallo films
Films directed by Tonino Ricci
Films with screenplays by Rafael Azcona
1970s Italian films